The four big families of Hong Kong is a term used to describe the four business families who historically rose to prominence and became influential in Hong Kong. In order of influence, they are Li, Ho, Lo and Hui family.

The founders of the original four families are Li Sek-peng, Robert Ho Tung, Hui Oi-chow and Lo Cheung-shiu.  Of these families, the Lis and the Hos and their descendants are the two most recognized by regular Hong Kong citizens today.

Families 

The families and their descendants are listed below. Each indentation represents one generation down, though not necessarily the next generation. Not all the descendants are shown. Most members of these families have reached tycoon status.

Li family notables 

  Li Shek-pang (李石朋, 1863–1916) also known as Li Pui-choi (李佩材) – Originally from Guangdong
  Li Koon-chun (李冠春, 1887–1966) – Founder of Bank of East Asia, Director of Tung Wah Group of Hospitals and Po Leung Kuk
  Li Fook-shu (李福樹, 1912–95) – Council member of Chinese University of Hong Kong
 David Li (李國寶, 1939–) – Chairman, Bank of East Asia, Member of LegCo, ExCo, and HK Basic Law Drafting Committee
 Arthur Li (李國章, 1945–) – Hong Kong Secretary for Education & Manpower (2002–2007), ExCo Member, CPPC Delegate, Council member of the University of Hong Kong
 Jeanette Chi-duen, Li
 Jennifer Chi-ping, Li
 Ronald Li (李福兆, 1929–2014) – Founder & Chairman of Stock Exchange of Hong Kong
 Li Tse-fong (李子方, 1891–1953)
 Li Fook-kow (李福逑, 1922–2011) Hong Kong Secretary for Home Affairs (1977–1980)

Ho family notables 

  Robert Ho Tung (何東, 1862–1956) – Businessman, philanthropist
 Victoria Hotung (何錦姿, 1897–92) ∞ Man-kam Lo
 Edward Hotung (何世儉, 1902–57)
  Sir Joseph Hotung (何鴻卿, 1930–2021)
  Eric Hotung (何鴻章, 1926–2017)
 Robert Hotung (何世禮, 1906–98)
   George Ho (何佐芝, 1918–2014) – Founder of the Commercial Radio Hong Kong
 George Joseph Ho (何驥 1950–) – Chairman of the Commercial Radio Hong Kong
  Ho Fook (何福, 1863–1926) – Businessman, philanthropist
  Ho Sai-wing – comprador, Hong Kong & Shanghai Bank
  Ho Sai-iu (何世耀)
  John Ho (何鴻超, 1916–2005) – Hon. Clinical Professor in clinical oncology, HKU
  Ho Sai-kwong (何世光)
  Stanley Ho (何鴻燊, 1921–2020) – Head of Macau casinos
 Pansy Ho (何超瓊, 1962–) – Group Executive Chairman and Managing Director of Shun Tak Holdings
 Daisy Ho (何超鳳, 1964–) – Current Head of Macau casinos as the chairman and executive director of SJM Holdings
 Josie Ho (何超儀, 1974–) – Singer and actress
 Lawrence Ho (何猷龍, 1976–) – Chief exec of Melco International development
 Ho Sai-chuen (何世全, 1891–1938) – Doctor and member of the Sanitary Board
  Ho Sai-ki (何世奇)
 Eric Peter Ho (何鴻鑾, 1927–2015) – Hong Kong government official
   Ho Kom-tong (何甘棠, 1866–1950) – Businessman, philanthropist
  Grace Ho (何愛瑜) ∞ Lee Hoi-chuen
  Bruce Lee (李小龍, 1940–73) – Movie star and martial artist
 Brandon Lee (李國豪, 1965–93) – Actor and martial artist

Hui family notables 

  Hui Oi-chow (1881–1966) – Businessman
 Hui Kei-pak
 Victor Hui – Chairman of Hong Kong Football Association, vice-president of Sports Federation and Olympic Committee of Hong Kong, China
 Charles Hui (許晉平)
  Stephen Hui (1912–1989)
 Sylvia Hui
 Richard Hui
  William Hui
 John Hui
 Brian Hui
 Nicola Hui
 Alex Hui 
  Hui Sai-fun (1921–2018)
 Jenkin Hui (1939–2014)
 Hui Suet Yuen
 Julian Hui (1962–) ∞ (1) Pansy Ho ∞ (2) Michelle Reis
 Jayden Max Hui (2011–)

Lo family notables 

 Lo Cheung-shiu (羅長肇, 1867–1934) – Compradore of Jardine, Matheson & Co.
 Lo Man-kam (羅文錦, 1893–1959) – Solicitor, founder of Lo and Lo law firm, member of the Executive and Legislative Councils of Hong Kong, married to Victoria Hotung, daughter of Robert Ho Tung
 Lo Tak-shing (羅德丞, 1935–2006) – Solicitor, member of the Hong Kong Basic Law Drafting Committee, CPPCC Executive and Legislative Councils of Hong Kong
 Lo Man-wai (羅文惠, 1895–1985) – Solicitor and member of the Executive and Legislative Councils.
 Kenneth Lo Tak-cheung (羅德璋, 1920–2007) – Lawyer, member of the Legislative and Urban Councils.
  Enid Lo (羅德貞) – Hong Kong Tennis Champion, married to John L. Litton
 Henry Litton (列顯倫, 1934–) – Non-Permanent Judge of the Court of Final Appeal
 John Litton QC (烈宗仁) – Barrister, Hong Kong Bar (1990– ), English Bar (1991– )
  Doris Lo (羅巧貞) – married to Ho Sai-ki
 Eric Peter Ho (何鴻鑾, 1927–2015) – Hong Kong government official

Other definitions 

Victor Wan-tai Zheng, co-author of Grand Old Man of Hong Kong: Sir Robert Ho Tung (2007) and Opium King: Lee Hysan (2011), lists 10 "Wealthy Chinese Family Busineses in Hong Kong" in his PhD thesis: Ho Tung Family, Li Shek-pang Family, Fung Pak-liu Family (note: , co-founder of Li & Fung), Lee Leung-yick Family (note: father of Lee Hysan), Chau Wing-tai Family, Hui Oi-chow Family,  Family, Kowk (Wing On) Family,  Family and  Family.

He also lists a number of families, including Wang Lo Kat (Wong Lo Kat) and Lee Kam Kee (Lee Kum Kee), in a separate category. The thesis was later modified and published as Chinese Family Business and the Equal Inheritance System: Unravelling the Myth in 2010.

Other authors have suggested new Four big families for the post colonial era. In this case, there are many more variants, including the Li Ka-shing, Kwok Tak-seng, Lee Shau-kee and Cheng Yu-tung families or the Tung Chee-hwa, James Tien, Henry Tang and Rong Yiren families.

Some scholars have gone even further by widening it to include the "big 10 families": Li Ka-shing family, Swire family, Keswick family, Kwok Tak-seng family, Pao Yue-kong family, Kadoorie family, Lee Shau-kee family, Cheng Yu-tung family, Chan Tseng-Hsi family and Ng Teng Fong family.

Most of the latter members have been associated with the term "real estate tycoons", a label made popular by Alice Poon's book Land and the Ruling Class in Hong Kong. In her book, she lists the Lis [Ka-shing], the Kwoks [Tak-seng], the Lees [Shau-kee], the Chengs [Yu-tung], the Paos [Yue-kong] and Woos [Peter] and the Kadoories as the powerful Hong Kong families who hold sway over local "property-cum-utility/public services conglomerates". The Chinese translation of the book uses  as a section title.

As of 2018, Li Ka-shing and Lee Shau-kee were ranked first and second in Forbes' Hong Kong's 50 Richest respectively, while Thomas and Raymond Kwok brothers, sons of the late Kwok Tak-seng, were ranked 4th; their eldest brother, Walter Kwok (d. 20 October 2018), was ranked 10th. Richard Li, the younger son of Li Ka-shing, was ranked 19th. Henry Cheng, son of the late Cheng Yu-tung, was ranked 49th. Some of the members of the aforementioned "new" families were also on the list, such as Peter Woo, son-in-law of the late Pao Yue-kong (6th), Michael Kadoorie (12th), the brothers Tung Chee-hwa and Chee-chen (17th) and Chan Tan Ching-fen, widow of Chan Tseng-His (35th).

See also 

 Five Great Clans of the New Territories
 Kom Tong Hall, a historical building that was owned by Ho Kom-tong
 Four big families of the Republic of China

References 

Four big families
Families of Hong Kong
History of Hong Kong
Political families of China